Jeffrey R. Woodburn (born June 1965) from Dalton, New Hampshire is a former Democratic member of the New Hampshire Senate for the 1st district, elected in 2012. He was the minority leader of the Senate Democratic caucus.  Woodburn served on the Public and Municipal Affairs Committee and the Election Law and Internal Affairs Committee.

Woodburn graduated in 1987 from Franklin Pierce College, and won a seat in the New Hampshire House of Representatives after graduation. He served one term (1989 to 1991). He previously ran for the State House in 1986, but lost to Harold Burns. He served as Chairman of the New Hampshire Democratic Party (1997 to 1999), and as the executive director for U.S. Representative Richard Swett. Woodburn has also worked as a social studies teacher, freelance writer, real estate businessman, and town moderator. He previously ran for the Executive Council of New Hampshire in 2000, losing to Peter J. Spaulding. He ran for Coos County Commission in 2004, but lost to Thomas M. Brady.

Woodburn was arrested on August 2, 2018, on simple assault, domestic violence, criminal mischief, and criminal trespass charges. Democratic Party Chairman Raymond Buckley called on him to resign. On August 6, Woodburn announced he would resign as the minority leader but would remain as a senator.  He won the Democratic primary on September 11, 2018, but was defeated by Republican David Starr in the 2018 general election.

In May 2021 a jury convicted Woodburn of one count of domestic violence, one count of simple assault, and two counts of criminal mischief, but acquitted him of three counts of simple assault, one count of domestic violence, and one count of criminal trespass. He received a sixty-day jail term.

Electoral history

References

External links
Project Vote Smart profile

1964 births
20th-century American politicians
21st-century American politicians
Franklin Pierce University alumni
Living people
Democratic Party members of the New Hampshire House of Representatives
Democratic Party New Hampshire state senators
New Hampshire politicians convicted of crimes
People acquitted of assault
People acquitted of crimes
People convicted of assault
People convicted of domestic violence
People from Coös County, New Hampshire
State political party chairs of New Hampshire